Karmachakra also known as Karmachakra: Episode Zero is an anime-influenced original mystery drama Indian animated film produced by Studio Durga. Billed as the first independent Indian anime production, the project was first announced in 2017. Production was completed in 2020. Karmachakra: Episode Zero is planned to be the first of a series of three Karmachakra films.

A 20-minute pilot was released on YouTube in February 2020.

Plot
A young orphan girl tries to find her dead parents.

Cast
 Swastika Mukherjee as Ganga
 Sabyasachi Chakrabarty as Dr. Roy
 Tanusree Shankar as Mita Di
 Mir Afsar Ali as Arka
 Santu Mukherjee as Professor Sid
 Anik Dutta as Ghoshal
 Parno Mittra as Meghna
 Swaroopa Ghosh as Madhavi
 Alaknanda Roy as Mrs. Roy
 Shaantilal Mukherjee as Gautam
 Barun Chanda as Gomes
 Shamik Sinha as Ronnie
 Rajorshi Basu as Rick

References

External links
Official website

Anime-influenced animation
India-centric
Anime in India
Indian animated films
Indian mystery drama films
Bengali-language Indian films
Hindi-language drama films